This is a list of seasons completed by the Cal State Fullerton Titans football team.

Seasons

References

Cal State Fullerton Titans

Cal State Fullerton Titans football seasons